Keys to Imagination is the second studio album by Greek keyboardist and composer Yanni, released on the Private Music label in 1986.

Background & production
In an interview with Cymbiosis, Yanni said that he often spent 12–15 hours a day producing the album. Yanni also stated that his favorite part about producing the album was to activate "up to six or seven [slave] keyboards" and that "the most simple sounds on Keys to Imagination are made with at least two or three keyboards."

Critical reception
In a review by Backroads Music/Heartbeats, "Yanni's first Private Music release is a true masterpiece of dramatic synthesizer music. His music is lusty and brilliant, richly melodious and memorable, full of passion & life as befits his Greek heritage. One of the ultimate car-stereo albums, Yanni's flamboyant, superb style of compositions makes Keys to Imagination some of the most extravagant, hyperspace music we know." Mark Jacobs of Cymbiosis, praised the album, writing "Yanni displays sensitivity and warmth that conveys emotions to the listener while still achieving excellent recorded sound; qualities that are sadly lacking on many 'Synthesizer' albums." Jacobs cited two songs, "Looking Glass" and "Santorini", which were also included in the corresponding cassette for the magazine.

Track listing

Notes
"Port of Mystery" is most well-known around the web as being one of the background tracks used in The "Concept Unification" installation videotape from 1989, which instructed the process that replaced The Rock-afire Explosion animatronic band at ShowBiz Pizza Place with characters from Chuck E. Cheese's due to a licensing disagreement with Creative Engineering.

Personnel
All music composed and produced by Yanni

Production
Yanni recorded Keys to Imagination at his home studio in Minneapolis, Minnesota.

Executive Producer:  Peter Baumann
Mixed by Peter Baumann, Jerry Steckling, and Yanni
Engineer: Jerry Steckling
Assistant Engineer: Chris Bubacz
Mastered at Masterdisk (New York City by Bob Ludwig)
Cover concept: Peter Baumann
Photo-Illustration: Stafford/Wehlacz for Prima Vista Studios
Art Direction: Dale Wehlacz
Photography: Stafford
Photocomposite: M. Bonner

References

External links
Official Website

Yanni albums
1986 albums
Space music albums by Greek artists